The 1944 Dunedin mayoral election was part of the New Zealand local elections held that same year. In 1944, elections were held for the Mayor of Dunedin plus other local government positions including twelve city councillors. The polling was conducted using the standard first-past-the-post electoral method.

Background
Andrew Henson Allen, the incumbent Mayor, declined to run for a third term. Gervan McMillan the retired Labour MP for Dunedin West contested the mayoralty for a second time, but was narrowly defeated by councillor Donald Cameron. McMillan did, however, win a seat on the council.

Labour gained ground on the city council, winning six of the twelve seats, with three Citizens' councillors seeking re-election defeated. A recount was called for the city council poll by a Labour candidate Mark Silverstone. It changed the result slightly with Michael Connelly displacing Wally Hudson as the lowest polling successful candidate. It did not alter the party strength on the council as both had run as Labour candidates. The council viewed judged the recount to be unjustified and charged Silverstone to cover the cost of the recounting efforts.

Mayoral results

Council results

 
 
 

 
 

 
 

 

 
 

 

 
 
 

Table footnotes:
<noinclude>

References

Mayoral elections in Dunedin
1944 elections in New Zealand
Politics of Dunedin
1940s in Dunedin